Mitrella turbita is a species of sea snail in the family Columbellidae, the dove snails.

Description
The length of the shell attains 9.1 mm.

References

 Pelorce, J. & Boyer, F., 2005. La famille Columbellidae (Gastropoda: Muricoidea) dans l'infralittoral de la Péninsule du Cap Vert (Sénégal). Iberus 23(2): 95-118
 Monsecour, K. (2010). Checklist of Columbellidae. pers. comm.

External links
 Dautzenberg, P. (1891). Voyage de la goëlette Melita aux Canaries et au Sénégal, 1889-1890: Mollusques Testacés. Mémoires de la Société Zoologique de France. 4: 16-65, pl. 3.
 Maltzan H. F. von. (1884). Diagnosen neuer Senegambischer Gastropoden. Nachrichtsblatt der Deutschen Malakozooologischen Gesellschaft, 16: 65-73
 Chenu J.C. (1842-1854). Illustrations conchyliologiques, ou description et figures de toutes les coquilles connues, vivantes et fossiles.,. Paris. 85 parts in 4 volumes

turbita
Gastropods described in 1840